In thermodynamics, a material's thermal effusivity, also known as thermal responsivity, is a measure of its ability to exchange thermal energy with its surroundings. It is defined as the square root of the product of the material's thermal conductivity and its volumetric heat capacity.

Thermal effusivity is a good approximation for the material's thermal inertia for a semi-infinite rigid body where heat transfer is dominated by the diffusive process of conduction only.

Thermal effusivity is a parameter that emerges upon applying solutions of the heat equation to heat flow through a thin surface-like region.  It becomes particularly useful when the region is selected adjacent to a material's actual surface.  Knowing the effusivity and equilibrium temperature of each of two material bodies then enables an estimate of their interface temperature  when placed into thermal contact.

Specialty sensors have also been developed based on this relationship to measure effusivity.  

Thermal effusivity and thermal diffusivity are related quantities; respectively a product versus a ratio of a material's fundamental transport and storage properties.  The diffusivity appears explicitly in the heat equation, which is an energy conservation equation, and measures the speed at which thermal equilibrium can be reached by a body.  By contrast a body's effusivity (also sometimes called inertia, accumulation, responsiveness etc.) is its ability to resist a temperature change when subjected to a time-periodic, or similarly perturbative, forcing function.

Applications

Temperature at a contact surface 

This relationship can be demonstrated with a very simple "control volume" back-of-the-envelope calculation:

Consider the following 1D heat conduction problem. Region 1 is material 1, initially at uniform temperature , and region 2 is material 2, initially at uniform temperature . Given some period of time  after being brought into contact, heat will have diffused across the boundary between the two materials. From the heat equation (or diffusion equation), a characteristic diffusion length  into material 1 is
, where .
Similarly, a characteristic diffusion length  into material 2 is
, where . 
Assume that the temperature within the characteristic diffusion length on either side of the boundary between the two materials is uniformly at the contact temperature  (this is the essence of a control-volume approach). Conservation of energy dictates that 
. 

This expression is valid for all times for semi-infinite bodies in perfect thermal contact. It is also a good first guess for the initial contact temperature for finite bodies.

Clearly, this analogy must be used with caution; among other caveats, it only applies in a transient sense, to media which are large enough (or time scales short enough) to be considered effectively infinite in extent.

Heat sensed by human skin 

An application of thermal effusivity is the quasi-qualitative measurement of coolness or warmth "feel" of materials, also known as thermoception.  It is a particularly important metric for textiles, fabrics, and building materials.   Rather than temperature,  skin thermoreceptors are highly responsive to the inward or outward flow of heat.  Thus, despite having similar temperatures near room temperature, a high effusivity metal object is detected as cool while a low effusivity fabric is sensed as being warmer.

Planetary science 

For planetary surfaces, thermal inertia is a key phenomenon controlling the diurnal and seasonal surface temperature variations.  The thermal inertia of a terrestrial  planet such as Mars can be approximated from the thermal effusivity of its near-surface geologic materials. In remote sensing applications, thermal inertia represents a complex combination of particle size, rock abundance, bedrock outcropping and the degree of induration (i.e. thickness and hardness).

A rough approximation to thermal inertia is sometimes obtained from the amplitude of the diurnal temperature curve (i.e. maximum minus minimum surface temperature). The temperature of a material with low thermal effusivity changes significantly during the day, while the temperature of a material with high thermal effusivity does not change as drastically. Deriving and understanding the thermal inertia of the surface can help to recognize small-scale features of that surface. In conjunction with other data, thermal inertia can help to characterize surface materials and the geologic processes responsible for forming these materials.

On Earth, thermal inertia of the global ocean is a major factor influencing climate commitment, the degree of global warming predicted to eventually result from a step change in climate forcing, such as a fixed increase in atmospheric greenhouse gases.  Ocean thermal inertia is much greater than land inertia because of convective heat transfer, especially through the upper mixed layer.  The thermal effusivities of stagnant and frozen water underestimate the vast thermal inertia of the multi-layered ocean.

Thermographic inspection 

Thermographic inspection encompasses a variety of nondestructive testing methods that utilize the wave-like characteristics of heat propagation through a transfer medium.   These methods include Pulse-echo thermography and thermal wave imaging.   Thermal effusivity and diffusivity of the materials being inspected can serve to simplify the mathematical modelling of, and thus interpretation of results from these techniques.

Measurement interpretation 

When a material is measured from the surface with short test times by any transient method or instrument, the heat transfer mechanisms generally include conduction, convection and radiation.  Conduction may dominate the thermal behavior of solid bodies near and below room temperature.  

A contact resistance (due to surface roughness, oxidation, impurities, etc.) between the sensor and sample may also exist.   Evaluations with high heat dissipation (driven by large temperature differentials) can likewise be influenced by an interfacial thermal resistance.  All of these factors, along with the body's finite dimensions, must be considered during execution of measurements and interpretation of results.

Thermal effusivity of selected materials and substances 

This is a list of the thermal effusivity of some common substances, evaluated at room temperature unless otherwise indicated.

<small>(*)  minimal convection

See also 
 Heat capacity
 Heat equation
 Specific heat capacity
 Thermal diffusivity

References

External links
 

Thermodynamic properties
Physical quantities
Heat conduction
Materials testing